Andrés Montaño (born April 6, 1990) is an Ecuadorian Greco-Roman wrestler. He competed in the men's Greco-Roman 59 kg event at the 2016 Summer Olympics, in which he was eliminated in the round of 16 by Wang Lumin.

He won the gold medal in his event at the 2022 Bolivarian Games held in Valledupar, Colombia.

References

External links
 

1990 births
Living people
Ecuadorian male sport wrestlers
Olympic wrestlers of Ecuador
Wrestlers at the 2016 Summer Olympics
Wrestlers at the 2019 Pan American Games
Pan American Games medalists in wrestling
Pan American Games gold medalists for Ecuador
Medalists at the 2019 Pan American Games
Pan American Wrestling Championships medalists
21st-century Ecuadorian people